Madrastra is a monotypic genus of antlions belonging to the family Myrmeleontidae. The only species is Madrastra handlirschi.

References

Acanthaclisini
Monotypic Neuroptera genera
Neuroptera genera